Boonara is a rural locality in the Gympie Region, Queensland, Australia.

History 

The Boonara pastoral station was established in 1862.

Land in Boonara was open for selection on 17 April 1877;  were available.

Boonara Provisional School was opened on 20 January 1902. In 1909 became Boonara State School. It closed on 22 May 1964. It was on the Burnett Highway just to the south of the homestead (approx ).

St David's Anglican Church opened in 1914.

Heritage listings 
The Boonara Homestead at 1791 Burnett Highway is listed on the Gympie Heritage Register.

Amenities 
St David's Anglican Church is at 7179 Burnett Highway. There is a cemetery behind the church.

References

External links

Gympie Region
Localities in Queensland